Deborah Sue Armstrong (née Edwards; born November 9, 1954, in Taylor, Texas) is an American former sprinter. Armstrong competed in the 400 metres (heats) of the 1972 Summer Olympics and the 200 metres (semi-final) and the 4 × 100 metres relay (seventh place) of the 1976 Summer Olympics.

In 1975 she was US champion in the 200 metres.

She is married to Trinidad and Tobago sprinter Ainsley Armstrong. Their son Aaron Armstrong competes for Trinidad and Tobago, winning a gold medal in the 2008 Olympics.

References

External links
 Profile at trackfield.brinkster.net

1954 births
Living people
People from Taylor, Texas
Track and field athletes from Texas
American female sprinters
African-American female track and field athletes
Olympic track and field athletes of the United States
Athletes (track and field) at the 1972 Summer Olympics
Athletes (track and field) at the 1976 Summer Olympics
Olympic female sprinters
21st-century African-American people
21st-century African-American women
20th-century African-American sportspeople
20th-century African-American women
20th-century African-American people